Penguin Island is an island of Namibia. It is located in Lüderitz Bay, south of Seal Island.

References 

Islands of Namibia
Islands of the South Atlantic Ocean